Transformers Revenge of the Fallen: Autobots is an action-adventure video game based on the 2009 live action film Transformers: Revenge of the Fallen. It is the Nintendo DS port of Transformers: Revenge of the Fallen, but follows a different storyline and focuses exclusively on the Autobots. It was developed by Vicarious Visions alongside Transformers Revenge of the Fallen: Decepticons, which follows the Decepticons; the two games share some basic similarities, but overall feature different characters, missions and locations. Both games were published by Activision in June 2009, and received mixed reviews.

Gameplay

As with Transformers: The Game, the DS version of Revenge of the Fallen splits the Autobot and Decepticon campaigns into two different games. The two games feature 25 missions in total, and the ability to battle friends via the handheld's Nintendo Wi-Fi Connection. Similar to Transformers Autobots, players must customize their own Transformer, known as "Create-A-Bot", who can be furthered customized during the game using parts found in missions. The difference between this game and its predecessors is that while scanning a vehicle to choose an alternate form, players are limited to "light" vehicles, which are fast but weak, "medium" vehicles, which are fast and strong, and "heavy" vehicles, which are strong but slow, and the protoform can't scan another vehicle once one has been already chosen. Another addition is that multiple weapons, armor and upgrades can be found throughout the game.

Synopsis

Characters 
Similar to the first set of Transformers games for the DS, the player gets to create their own character which they play as throughout the campaign.  Many of the main Transformers from the movie appear throughout the story to aid the player, and several are available to play as in challenges.

Create-A-Bot: The player character, who is depicted as a Transformer having just recently arrived on Earth and joined the Autobots, seeking to impress his superiors.
Optimus Prime (voiced by Peter Cullen): The heroic, wise, and inspiring leader of the Autobots, who transforms into a Peterbilt 379 semi-truck. He is playable in the tutorial and challenge missions.
Jetfire (voiced by Clive Revill): An old Transformer and former Decepticon, who defected to the Autobots. He can transform into a Lockheed SR-71 Blackbird. Though unplayable, he is featured in a few missions in the game.
Bumblebee (voiced by Mark Ryan): An Autobot recon officer and scout, who transforms into a fifth-generation Chevrolet Camaro. He is only playable in challenge missions.
Ratchet (voiced by Robert Foxworth): The Autobots' medical officer, who transforms into a Search and Rescue Hummer H2. Though unplayable, he makes several appearances throughout the game, and gives the player useful hints.
Ironhide (voiced by Jess Harnell): The Autobots' weapon specialist, who transforms into a GMC Topkick pickup truck. Though unplayable, he is featured in several story and challenge missions.
Sideswipe: An Autobot soldier and a relatively recent addition to the team. He transforms into a Chevrolet Corvette Stingray Concept, and is only playable in challenge missions.
Breakaway: An Aerialbot who can transform into a F-35 Lightning II fighter jet and a relatively recent addition to the team. He is playable in only one story mission and one challenge mission.
Arcee and the twins, Skids and Mudflap, are only mentioned in the game and, therefore, unplayable.

Plot
During a mission in Brazil, Optimus Prime spots Create-A-Bot crashing on Earth. After defending him from Decepticon forces led by Starscream, Optimus sends Create-A-Bot to meet with Ratchet, who has him scan one of three vehicles to use as an alternate form, and teaches him how to drive, before having him work with Ironhide and Bumblebee to destroy several Decepticon drones in the area, including the Create-A-Bot from Transformers Revenge of the Fallen: Decepticons. Afterwards, Ratchet has Create-A-Bot transferred to one of the Autobot bases and assigns him his first mission in Eastern Europe: to help scan several NEST data vehicles to prevent the Decepticons from locating an AllSpark shard. He is then transferred to England, where he is ordered to destroy several turrets and the Decepticons guarding them, as well as disarm a bomb.

Meanwhile, Breakaway and Bumblebee help NEST defend their base and factory located on an oil rig in the Atlantic Ocean from a Decepticon attack. After Bumblebee fails to shut down the factory, he is rescued by Breakaway before it explodes. In Rome, Italy, Create-A-Bot helps NEST defend against Decepticon forces, ultimately fighting and defeating Grindor. Afterwards, he travels to Siberia to rescue several NEST troops taken as hostages by the Decepticon Sideways, before being transferred to another part of Asia to help place some supplies into an aircraft before the Decepticons can steal them. Create-A-Bot is next sent to Japan to defend Ironhide while he activates several generators in order to fend off an incoming Decepticon attack, before also going to Shanghai to stop the Decepticons from blowing the place up using bombs. After disarming the bombs, he is attacked by Sideways, whom he pursues and ultimately defeats.

Create-A-Bot later goes to Mexico to protect a communication transport from the Decepticons until the communications are re-established and backup arrives. He also travels to Canada to assist an Autobot in destroying several generators before the entire area is destroyed, and to Area 51, which he defends from a Decepticon attack. Once he is transferred to New York City, USA, Create-A-Bot is ordered to scan Energon radiation hot spots, allowing Ratchet to triangulate the source's location. He then locates and defeats Starscream, in the process saving Jetfire, who reveals himself as an ancient Seeker, formerly serving The Fallen. He also tells Create-A-Bot about the Primes and how The Fallen, a former Prime, became the first Decepticon after betraying his brothers and built a Sun Harvester, which can only be activated by the Autobot Matrix of Leadership, and can absorb power from the Sun and transform into Energon, destroying the Sun and, therefore, all life on Earth in the process. Create-A-Bot then takes Jetfire back to the Autobot base so that he could share this information with them as well. During this time, the Decepticons manage to retrieve the body of their deceased leader Megatron from the Laurentian Abyss, and revive him using a shard of the AllSpark.

The Autobots later travel to Arabia to gather intel about information transmitted by the Decepticon Soundwave by scanning several satellite dishes, allowing them to hack into the Decepticons' communication for several seconds. The information reveals an upcoming attack on a NEST base in South Africa, so Create-A-Bot is sent there to thwart it and manages to protect several newly armored NEST vehicles from the Decepticons. He then goes to the Sahara to help the NEST troops defend their base there from Decepticons, before heading to Egypt to recover the Matrix of Leadership and prevent The Fallen from using it to activate his Sun Harvester and, therefore, doom Earth. Learning that a Decepticon stole the Matrix, Create-A-Bot pursues him, while the massive Decepticon Devastator is unleashed to uncovers the Harvester from within the pyramid. Create-A-Bot manages to re-activate a Space Bridge and is teleported to the final confrontation between Optimus, The Fallen, Megatron, and the Decepticon who stole the Matrix.

Optimus instructs Create-A-Bot to pursue Megatron and retrieve the Matrix, while he battles The Fallen. After overcoming several obstacles, including the Decepticon Scorponok, Create-A-Bot faces Megatron inside the pyramid where the Harvester is located and defeats him, recovering the Matrix and contacting Ratchet afterwards to inform him of the success of his mission. Ratchet then also patches Optimus through the transmission, who reveals that he has killed The Fallen with Jetfire's help and congratulates Create-A-Bot for his bravery, saying that he has earned his respect. Optimus then states that, even though The Fallen has been defeated, the Decepticons remain a threat and the Autobots' mission on Earth is far from over.

Reception

Transformers: Revenge of The Fallen: Autobots was met with average reception upon release, as GameRankings gave it a score of 66.82%, while Metacritic gave it 64 out of 100.

Nintendo Power gave the game 7 out of 10, stating, "This may be the first time in video game history that a licensed DS title far exceeds the movie it's based on." IGN gave the game a score of 7 out of 10, stating that it "represents Transformers well".

References

2009 video games
Activision games
Multiplayer and single-player video games
Nintendo DS games
Nintendo DS-only games
Revenge Of The Fallen Autobots
Vicarious Visions games
Video games based on adaptations
Video games based on films
Video games developed in the United States
Video games set in Egypt
Video games set in the United States
fr:Transformers : La Revanche - Autobots